The 1957–58 St. Louis Hawks season was the third for the franchise in St. Louis, ninth in the National Basketball Association (NBA), and 12th overall. Coming off their trip to the 1957 NBA Finals, the Hawks won the Western Division by 8 games with a record of 41 wins and 31 losses. Bob Pettit ranked 3rd in scoring and 2nd in rebounding. In the Western Finals, the Hawks would beat the Detroit Pistons in 5 games. The Hawks would then face the Boston Celtics in the NBA Finals. After Games 1 and 2,  the teams headed to St. Louis with the series tied at a game apiece. The Hawks took Game 3, as the Celtics lost Bill Russell to an ankle injury. Despite playing without Russell, the Celtics were triumphant in Game 4. The Hawks pulled out a 2-point victory in the Game 5 to take control of the series. Needing one more win for their first NBA Championship, the Hawks beat the Celtics 110–109 in Game 6. Bob Pettit scored 50 points playing against an injured Bill Russell as the Hawks and owner Ben Kerner won their first NBA Title.

The Hawks were the second St. Louis-based pro sports team to win a major championship, joining the, then, six-time World Series Champion St. Louis Cardinals of Major League Baseball. They would be followed by five more World Series championships by the Cardinals, a championship by the St. Louis Rams in Super Bowl XXXIV, and a championship by the St. Louis Blues in the 2019 Stanley Cup Finals which made St. Louis the eighth city to win a championship in each of the four major U.S. sports.  The Hawks were the last non-integrated team to win an NBA title; every NBA champion since has had at least one African-American player.

Roster

Regular season

Season standings

Record vs. opponents

Game log

Playoffs

|- align="center" bgcolor="#ccffcc"
| 1
| March 19
| Detroit
| W 114–111
| Cliff Hagan (38)
| Kiel Auditorium7,328
| 1–0
|- align="center" bgcolor="#ccffcc"
| 2
| March 22
| @ Detroit
| W 99–96
| Cliff Hagan (27)
| University of Detroit Fieldhouse
| 2–0
|- align="center" bgcolor="#ffcccc"
| 3
| March 23
| Detroit
| L 89–109
| Cliff Hagan (29)
| Kiel Auditorium9,321
| 2–1
|- align="center" bgcolor="#ccffcc"
| 4
| March 25
| @ Detroit
| W 145–101
| Cliff Hagan (28)
| Detroit Olympia
| 3–1
|- align="center" bgcolor="#ccffcc"
| 5
| March 27
| Detroit
| W 120–96
| Cliff Hagan (32)
| Kiel Auditorium7,661
| 4–1
|-

|- align="center" bgcolor="#ccffcc"
| 1
| March 29
| @ Boston
| W 104–102
| Cliff Hagan (33)
| Bob Pettit (19)
| Boston Garden3,652
| 1–0
|- align="center" bgcolor="#ffcccc"
| 2
| March 30
| @ Boston
| L 112–136
| Cliff Hagan (37)
| Cliff Hagan (12)
| Boston Garden10,249
| 1–1
|- align="center" bgcolor="#ccffcc"
| 3
| April 2
| Boston
| W 111–108
| Bob Pettit (32)
| Bob Pettit (19)
| Kiel Auditorium10,148
| 2–1
|- align="center" bgcolor="#ffcccc"
| 4
| April 5
| Boston
| L 98–109
| Cliff Hagan (27)
| Bob Pettit (17)
| Kiel Auditorium10,216
| 2–2
|- align="center" bgcolor="#ccffcc"
| 5
| April 9
| @ Boston
| W 102–100
| Bob Pettit (33)
| Bob Pettit (21)
| Boston Garden13,909
| 3–2
|- align="center" bgcolor="#ccffcc"
| 6
| April 12
| Boston
| W 110–109
| Bob Pettit (50)
| Bob Pettit (19)
| Kiel Auditorium10,216
| 4–2
|-

Awards and honors
Bob Pettit, All-NBA First Team
Slater Martin, All-NBA Second Team
Cliff Hagan, All-NBA Second Team

References

Hawks on Basketball Reference

NBA championship seasons
St. Louis
Atlanta Hawks seasons
St. Louis Hawks
St. Louis Hawks